Prison-A-Go-Go! is an American film first released in October 2003 by WorldWide International Picture Studios, known for producing low budget B-movies with campy concepts.  The film premiered at the Deep Ellum Film Festival in 2003 and went on to win several awards.  The film was directed by Barak Epstein and starred Mary Woronov and Rhonda Shear.  The film is an homage/parody of women in prison films.

Plot
The evil and incompetent Dr. Hurtrider  kidnaps an innocent young woman named Callista to conduct experiments on her to cure disease, even if she doesn't have any.  Now it is up to her dimwitted sister, Janie to solve the obvious clues left behind and rescue her little sister. By reading the business card left behind, Janie figures out that Callista has been taken to a prison in the Philippines.  So she kills a mentally handicapped man, and is sent to the prison, led by an equally inept warden.  There she meets queen bitch Jackpot, and along with the stupid inmates, pathetic ninjas and a vast assortment of idiots, Janie figures out a way to rescue her sister and escape.

The film was marketed as being filled with multiple shower scenes, girls running amok, kung fu food fights, ninjas, mutant zombies, evil scientists, genetic mutation, and mud wrestling.

Cast

Reviews
Ain't it Cool News gave the movie a positive review.  However this was during Harry Knowles' tenure when he was accused of taking bribes for positive reviews.

Terribly Awful in their season 2 premier not only took issue with the obvious corruption of the positive review, one of the presenters went on an epic 5 minute rant.  Reviewer Matt Anderson went as far as saying that if he had known how bad the movie was, "I would have burned the DVD".  The reviewer also went on to call it "The worst fucking movie I have ever seen." and co-presenter Craig M. Rosenthal said "It's embarrassing to any filmmaker out there."

Awards
The film won several awards at the various film festivals that it was screened at.  It premiered at the 2003 B-Movie Film Festival and won four B-Movie awards including Best B-Movie, Best Director (Barak Epstein), Best Movie Actress (Rhonda Shear), and Best Set Design (Heather Mason).  The film won the 2003 Deep Ellum Award for Best Feature at the Deep Ellum Film Festival.  At the 2004 Backseat Film Festival Prison-A-Go-Go! took home the prize for Best Feature.  Then at the 2004 Twisted Sinema Underground Festival Prison-A-Go-Go! was given the award for Best Comedy.

References

External links 
 Terribly Awful Prison a Go Go review
 Official site 
 WIP Studios 
 
 

2003 films
2000s action comedy films
American action comedy films
American parody films
American independent films
Women in prison films
2003 comedy films
2000s English-language films
2000s American films